The 2008 South Lakeland District Council election took place on 1 May 2008 to elect members of South Lakeland District Council in Cumbria, England. The whole council was up for election with boundary changes since the last election in 2007 reducing the number of seats by 1. The Liberal Democrats stayed in overall control of the council.

Background
Since the last election in 2007 boundary changes had taken place reducing the number of seats from 52 to 51. Among the changes made was the combining of the Sedbergh and Kirkby Lonsdale wards.

Before the election the Liberal Democrats ran the council with 31 seats, compared to 16 for the Conservatives, 2 for Labour, 1 Green Party and 1 independent. Among the sitting councillors to stand down at the election was the only independent David Foot.

Election result
The results saw the Liberal Democrats increase their majority on the council finishing the election up on 36 councillors. This came at the expense of the Conservatives who dropped to 14 seats and Labour who lost 1 of their 2 councillors. Meanwhile, the Green Party also lost their only seat in Kendal Far Cross.

Ward results

Rob Cocker was originally elected as a Liberal Democrat councillor.

Enda Farrell was originally elected as a Liberal Democrat councillor.

References

2008
2008 English local elections
2000s in Cumbria